Sidusa is a genus of jumping spiders that was first described by George and Elizabeth Peckham in 1895.

Species
 it contains twenty-six species, found in Central America, South America, the Caribbean, Mexico, and on Borneo:
Sidusa albopalpis (G. W. Peckham & E. G. Peckham, 1901) – Jamaica
Sidusa angulitarsis Simon, 1902 – Brazil
Sidusa beebei (Petrunkevitch, 1914) – Borneo
Sidusa carinata Kraus, 1955 – El Salvador
Sidusa dominicana Petrunkevitch, 1914 – Dominican Rep.
Sidusa erythrocras (Chamberlin & Ivie, 1936) – Panama
Sidusa femoralis Banks, 1909 – Costa Rica
Sidusa flavens (G. W. Peckham & E. G. Peckham, 1896) – Panama
Sidusa gratiosa G. W. Peckham & E. G. Peckham, 1895 (type) – Brazil
Sidusa guianensis (Caporiacco, 1947) – Guyana
Sidusa inconspicua Bryant, 1940 – Cuba
Sidusa incurva (Chickering, 1946) – Panama
Sidusa marmorea F. O. Pickard-Cambridge, 1901 – Costa Rica, Panama
Sidusa nigrina F. O. Pickard-Cambridge, 1901 – Mexico
Sidusa obscura (Chickering, 1946) – Panama
Sidusa olivacea F. O. Pickard-Cambridge, 1901 – Guatemala
Sidusa pallida F. O. Pickard-Cambridge, 1901 – Guatemala
Sidusa perdita (Banks, 1898) – Mexico
Sidusa scintillans (Crane, 1943) – Venezuela
Sidusa seclusa (Chickering, 1946) – Panama
Sidusa stoneri Bryant, 1923 – Antigua and Barbuda (Antigua)
Sidusa subfusca (F. O. Pickard-Cambridge, 1900) – Costa Rica, Panama
Sidusa tarsalis Banks, 1909 – Costa Rica
Sidusa turquinensis Bryant, 1940 – Cuba
Sidusa unica Kraus, 1955 – El Salvador
Sidusa viridiaurea (Simon, 1902) – Peru, Brazil

References

External links
 Painting of Sidusa sp. or possibly Maeota sp.
 Picture of S. recondita

Salticidae
Salticidae genera
Spiders of Central America
Spiders of Mexico
Spiders of South America